Iron Lore Entertainment was a video game developer that was founded in October 2000 by Brian Sullivan and Paul Chieffo.

In late June 2006, the company released Titan Quest, an action role-playing video game for publisher THQ. Titan Quest is set in ancient Greece, Egypt, Mesopotamia and China, and makes use of the mythology of those civilizations. The company released an expansion pack, Titan Quest: Immortal Throne, in March 2007.

Iron Lore received the New Studio award at the 7th annual Game Developers Choice Awards, recognizing outstanding achievement of a studio whose first title was released in 2006.

It was announced in the October 2007 issue of Games for Windows Magazine that Iron Lore Entertainment was assisting with the development of the Relic Entertainment title Warhammer 40,000: Dawn of War: Soulstorm, which was the third and final expansion for Dawn of War. It proved to be their last project.

On February 27, 2008, it was announced that Iron Lore Entertainment had closed down owing to an inability to secure funding for its next project.

Following the closure, former members of Iron Lore formed a new company called Crate Entertainment.

References

Defunct companies based in Massachusetts
Video game companies established in 2000
Video game companies disestablished in 2008
Defunct video game companies of the United States
Video game development companies
2000 establishments in Massachusetts
2008 disestablishments in Massachusetts